Ronald Bell may refer to:
Ronnie Bell (1907–1996), British physical chemist
Sir Ronald Bell (politician) (1914–1982), British Conservative Member of Parliament, 1945 and 1950–1982
Ronald Bell (cricketer) (1931–1989), English cricketer for Middlesex and Sussex
Ronald Bell (musician) (1951–2020), American singer-songwriter with Kool & the Gang
Ronald D. Bell, Justice of the Tax Court of Canada
Ronnie Bell (American football) (born 2000), American football player